Bettina Hagedorn (née Siebmann, born 26 December 1955) is a German politician of the Social Democratic Party (SPD) who has been serving as a member of the German Bundestag since September 2002, representing Ostholstein - Stormarn-Nord. From 2018 to 2021, she also served as Parliamentary State Secretary in the Federal Ministry of Finance under minister Olaf Scholz in the fourth coalition government of Chancellor Angela Merkel.

Early life and education
Hagedorn was born in Kiel, but grew up in Laboe. After graduation in 1974 in Preetz, she began studying special education and biology at the University of Hamburg, which she broke off in 1976. Instead, she completed an apprenticeship as a goldsmith in Plön, which she finished in 1980 with a journeyman's certificate.

Political career

Career in local politics
Since 1983 Hagedorn has been a member of the SPD. From 1991 to 2003, she was a member of the SPD district executive Ostholstein, from 1993 as deputy district chairwoman. From 2003 to 2019 she was a member of the state executive committee of the SPD in Schleswig-Holstein. From 2007 to 2019 she served as deputy state chairwoman of the SPD in Schleswig-Holstein, under the leadership of chairman Ralf Stegner.

From 1986 to 2003 Hagedorn was a member of the municipal council of her place of residence, Kasseedorf, where she also served as a deputy mayor (1994–1997) and mayor (1997–2003).

Member of Parliament, 2002–present
Since the 2002 national elections Hagedorn has been a member of the German Bundestag. From 2002 until 2018, she served on the Budget Committee, where she was her parliamentary group's rapporteur on the budgets of the Federal Ministry of Family Affairs, Senior Citizens, Women and Youth (2002-2005); the Federal Ministry of the Interior (2005-2009); the Federal Ministry of Labour and Social Affairs (2009-2013); and the Federal Ministry of Transport and Digital Infrastructure (2013-2017).

Throughout that period, Hagedorn also served on the Audit Committee, which she chaired from 2013 until 2017. Both from 2005 to 2009 and from 2013 to 2017, she was a member of the so-called Confidential Committee (Vertrauensgremium) of the Budget Committee, which provides budgetary supervision for Germany’s three intelligence services, BND, BfV and MAD.

In addition to her committee assignments, Hagedorn is a member of the German Parliamentary Friendship Group with the Nordic States. Within her parliamentary group, she has been serving as on the working groups on budgetary policies since 2009 and for municipal policies since 2005. She also belongs to the Parliamentary Left, a left-wing movement.

In 2015, Hagedorn was one of the victims of a large-scale cyberattack on the German Parliament’s computer network.

In the 2017 federal elections, Hagedorn led her party’s list for Schleswig-Holstein. In Chancellor Angela Merkel’s fourth cabinet, she joined the federal government as one of two Parliamentary State Secretaries – alongside Christine Lambrecht (2018-2019), later Sarah Ryglewski (2019–2021) – serving under Finance Minister Olaf Scholz. In this capacity, she participated in the fifth German-Indian government consultations in Delhi in November 2019.

Following the 2021 elections, Hagedorn joined the Budget Committee again, where she has since been serving as her parliamentary group’s rapporteur on the annual budget of the Federal Ministry for Economic Cooperation and Development. In addition to her committee assignments, she is part of the German Parliamentary Friendship Group for Relations with the Baltic States.

Other activities

Corporate boards
 GIZ, Member of the Supervisory Board (since 2022) 
 Verkehrsinfrastrukturfinanzierungsgesellschaft mbH (VIFG), Member of the Supervisory Board (since 2013)

Non-profit organizations
 Federal Foundation for the Reappraisal of the SED Dictatorship, Member of the Board of Trustees (since 2018)
 German Federal Environmental Foundation (DBU), Member of the Board of Trustees (2018–2021)
 German Children's Fund (DKHW), Member of the Board (since 2013)
 Friedrich Ebert Foundation (FES), Member
 German Federal Environmental Foundation (DBU), Member of the Board of Trustees (2018–2021)
 Federal Agency for Civic Education, Member of the Board of Trustees (2006–2009)

Personal life
Hagedorn is divorced and has three sons.

References

Female members of the Bundestag
Living people
1955 births
Members of the Bundestag for Schleswig-Holstein
Politicians from Kiel
Women government ministers of Germany
Women mayors of places in Germany
Mayors of places in Schleswig-Holstein
University of Hamburg alumni
20th-century German politicians
20th-century German women politicians
21st-century German women politicians
Members of the Bundestag 2021–2025
Members of the Bundestag 2017–2021
Members of the Bundestag 2013–2017
Members of the Bundestag 2009–2013
Members of the Bundestag 2005–2009
Members of the Bundestag 2002–2005
Members of the Bundestag for the Social Democratic Party of Germany
Parliamentary State Secretaries of Germany